Thomas Bänsch is a retired East German rower who won two silver and two bronze medals at the world championships of 1985–1990.

References

Year of birth missing (living people)
Living people
East German male rowers
World Rowing Championships medalists for East Germany